The modern Welsh language contains names for many towns and other geographical features in Great Britain and elsewhere. Names for places outside of Welsh-speaking regions are exonyms, not including spelling or pronunciation adaptions and translations of non-proper nouns.

Names in italics are dated or obsolete.

Argentina

Australia

Belgium

Canada

Czech Republic

France

Germany

Greece

Israel/Palestine

Ireland

Italy

Japan

South Africa

Spain

Turkey

United Kingdom

United States

Sources 

 Collins-Longman, Yr Atlas Cymraeg Newydd,  (1999)
 Book of Llandaff

See also
 List of European exonyms
 List of European regions with alternative names
 List of European rivers with alternative names
 Names of European cities in different languages
 Welsh placenames
 Welsh place names in other countries

References

Welsh language
Lists of exonyms